Angela Cazac (born 13 June 1971) is a Romanian rower. She competed in the women's coxless pair event teamed with her sister Liliana Cazac at the 1996 Summer Olympics.

References

External links
 

1971 births
Living people
Romanian female rowers
Olympic rowers of Romania
Rowers at the 1996 Summer Olympics
World Rowing Championships medalists for Romania